Murdochville is a town in Quebec, Canada, one of only a few inland communities on the Gaspé Peninsula.  Its population (as of 2016) is 651.

History

In 1921, copper ore was discovered in the area by the Miller brothers: Alfred, Sydney, Frederick, Angus and Theophilus. However, it was not until 1950 that Noranda Mines actually began mining. The mining town was set up and named after James Y. Murdoch, owner of the mine and first president of Noranda. In 1953, the town was incorporated.

The mining operation in the town was comparatively large, starting with mining the raw ore and finishing with an end product of pure copper anode. In the 1970s, the mining operation in Murdochville was large enough to support a population of 5,000 inhabitants. A number of large union battles in Murdochville also helped lay the groundwork for ideas that still exist today. The 1957 Murdochville strike led to the adoption of several new laws protecting the rights of unionized workers in Quebec.

In 1987, the mine was partially destroyed by an underground fire, and mining only resumed two years later.

The mine closed in 1999, leaving the town to fight for survival. After several close calls, the small town has decided to fight back, in an effort to reverse the economic uncertainty that has befallen the town. This has included the creation of several large wind turbine projects, along with the diversification of the local economy, with emphasis on tourism (such as skiing in the winter months).

Demographics 

Climate
Murdochville has a warm-summer humid continental climate (Dfb). Summers are relatively cool and short, whereas winters are long and at times very cold with massive amounts of snowfall. The brief summers are, however, mild enough to keep September (the fourth-warmest month) right above the  isotherm for a humid continental climate.

See also
 List of cities in Quebec

References

External links
Town of Murdochville

Incorporated places in Gaspésie–Îles-de-la-Madeleine
Cities and towns in Quebec
Mining communities in Quebec
Populated places established in 1950
1950 establishments in Quebec